Anoplagonus is a genus of poachers native to the northern Pacific Ocean.

Species
There are currently two recognized species in this genus:
 Anoplagonus inermis (Günther, 1860) (Smooth alligatorfish)
 Anoplagonus occidentalis Lindberg, 1950

References

 
Anoplagoninae
Taxa named by Theodore Gill